Birhor may refer to:
the Birhor people
the Birhor language